Pope Dioscorus II of Alexandria, 31st Pope of Alexandria & Patriarch of the See of St. Mark. He was chosen Patriarch after the departure of his predecessor, St. John. His first work after his enthronement to the See of St. Mark was writing an epistle to Pope Severus, Patriarch of Antioch concerning the Holy Trinity and the Incarnation. Pope Dioscorus had Severus's reply read from the pulpit.

References

 St. Dioscorus II, 31st Pope of Alexandria

|-

|-

Dioscorus II of Alexandria
Byzantine saints
6th-century Popes and Patriarchs of Alexandria
6th-century Christian saints
Year of birth unknown
6th-century Byzantine writers